Liezel Huber and Sania Mirza were the defending champions, but only Mirza chose to participate that year. She paired up with Shikha Uberoi but lost in the quarterfinals to Yan Zi and Zheng Jie.

Yan and Zheng won the title, defeating Li Ting and Sun Tiantian 6–4, 6–1 in an all-Chinese final.

Seeds

Draw

Draw

Hyderabad Open - Doubles
Bangalore Open